Junín TV (call sign LRH 450 TV) is a television station broadcasting on channel 10 from Junín, Buenos Aires. The station carries programs from América TV

Local programming
Notivisión - newscast
Consulta Médica ("Medical Consultation") - health advice

Television stations in Argentina
Television channels and stations established in 1985
Argentine companies established in 1985